Ham-les-Moines is a commune in the Ardennes department in the Grand Est region in northern France.

Geography
The river Sormonne flows through the commune and forms part of its western and eastern borders.

Population

See also
Communes of the Ardennes department

References

Communes of Ardennes (department)
Ardennes communes articles needing translation from French Wikipedia